Kauai National Wildlife Refuge Complex is a National Wildlife Refuge complex in the state of Hawaii, US.

Refuges within the complex
Hanalei National Wildlife Refuge
Huleia National Wildlife Refuge
Kilauea Point National Wildlife Refuge

References

External links

National Wildlife Refuges in Hawaii